Paramedetera is a genus of fly in the family Dolichopodidae.

Species

References

Medeterinae
Dolichopodidae genera
Diptera of Asia